The First Born is a 1921 American silent film romantic drama directed by Colin Campbell and produced by and starring Sessue Hayakawa. It was distributed by the Robertson-Cole Company.

Cast
Sessue Hayakawa as Chan Wang
Helen Jerome Eddy as Loey Tsing
Sonny Loy as Chan Toy (credited as "Sonny Boy" Warde)
Goro Kino as Man Low Tek
Marie Pavis as Chan Lee
Frank M. Seki as Hop Lee
Wilson Hummel as Kuey Lar
Anna May Wong

Preservation status
The film is preserved at the BFI National Archive.

References

External links

1921 films
American silent feature films
Films directed by Colin Campbell
Film Booking Offices of America films
American black-and-white films
American romantic drama films
1921 romantic drama films
1920s American films
Silent romantic drama films
Silent American drama films